Kim Hyang-min (born 4 February 1942) is a North Korean archer who represented North Korea at the 1972 Summer Olympic Games in archery.

Career
Kim competed in the women's individual event and finished twentieth with a total of 2275 points.

At the 1978 Asian Games, she won a bronze medal in the women's individual and women's team events.

References

External links
 Profile on worldarchery.org

1942 births
Living people
North Korean female archers
Olympic archers of North Korea
Archers at the 1972 Summer Olympics
Asian Games medalists in archery
Archers at the 1978 Asian Games
Asian Games bronze medalists for North Korea
Medalists at the 1978 Asian Games
20th-century North Korean women